Pseudamnicola artanensis is a species of very small brackish water snail with an operculum, an aquatic gastropod mollusk in the family Hydrobiidae.

Distribution 
This species occurs in the island of Majorca.

References

Hydrobiidae
Gastropods described in 2007
Endemic fauna of the Balearic Islands